Ahlden is a Samtgemeinde ("collective municipality") in the Heidekreis district, in Lower Saxony, Germany. Its seat is in the village Hodenhagen.

The Samtgemeinde Ahlden consists of the following municipalities:

 Ahlden (Aller)
 Eickeloh
 Grethem
 Hademstorf
 Hodenhagen

References

External links 
 Official website (German)

Samtgemeinden in Lower Saxony
Heidekreis